Ilona Békési (born 11 December 1953) is a retired Hungarian gymnast. She competed at the 1968 and 1972 Summer Olympics in all artistic gymnastics events and finished in fifth and third place in the team competition, respectively. Her best individual result was fifth place on the uneven bars in 1972.

References

1953 births
Living people
Hungarian female artistic gymnasts
Gymnasts at the 1968 Summer Olympics
Gymnasts at the 1972 Summer Olympics
Olympic gymnasts of Hungary
Olympic bronze medalists for Hungary
Olympic medalists in gymnastics
Medalists at the 1972 Summer Olympics
Gymnasts from Budapest
20th-century Hungarian women
21st-century Hungarian women